Giulia Gabbrielleschi (born 24 July 1996) is an Italian swimmer who won a silver medal at the 2018 European Championships.

Career
Gabbrielleschi is an athlete of the Gruppo Sportivo Fiamme Oro.

In 2019, she represented Italy at the 2019 World Aquatics Championships held in Gwangju, South Korea. She competed in the women's 800 metre freestyle and women's 1500 metre freestyle events. In both events she did not advance to compete in the final. Two years later, at the 2020 European Aquatics Championships held in 2021 due to the COVID-19 pandemic, she won the silver medal in the 5 kilometre open water swim with a time of 58 minutes and 49.3 seconds, which was less than five seconds slower than gold medalist Sharon van Rouwendaal of the Netherlands.

At the 2022 World Aquatics Championships, in Budapest, Hungary, Gabbrielleschi won a bronze medal as part of the 6 kilometre team event. She also won a bronze medal in the 5 kilometre open water swim with a time of 57 minutes and 54.9 seconds, finishing only behind Ana Marcela Cunha of Brazil and Aurélie Muller of France. Two months later, at the 2022 European Aquatics Championships in Rome, she won the bronze medal in the 5 kilometre open water swim with a time of 57:00.3, finishing 1.6 seconds behind gold medalist Sharon van Rouwendaal of the Netherlands and 0.1 seconds behind silver medalist María de Valdés of Spain.

References

External links
 
Giulia Gabbrielleschi profile at FIN web site 

1996 births
Living people
Italian female long-distance swimmers
European Championships (multi-sport event) silver medalists
European Aquatics Championships medalists in swimming
People from Pistoia
Universiade silver medalists for Italy
Universiade medalists in swimming
World Aquatics Championships medalists in open water swimming
Swimmers of Fiamme Oro
Italian female freestyle swimmers
Sportspeople from the Province of Pistoia
21st-century Italian women